Progressive Party may refer to:

Active parties
 Progressive Party, Brazil
 Progressive Party (Chile)
 Progressive Party of Working People, Cyprus
 Dominica Progressive Party
 Progressive Party (Iceland)
 Progressive Party (Sardinia), Italy
 Jordanian Progressive Party
 Serbian Progressive Party in Macedonia
 Sabah Progressive Party, Malaysia
 Progressive Party of Maldives
 Martinican Progressive Party, Martinique
 Nigerien Progressive Party – African Democratic Rally, Niger
 Serbian Progressive Party
 Progressive Party (South Korea, 2017)
 Progressive Party (United States, 2020)
 Progressive Party of Tanzania – Maendeleo
 Progressive Party (Trinidad and Tobago)
 Oregon Progressive Party, USA
 Vermont Progressive Party, USA
 Melanesian Progressive Party, Vanuatu

Historical or former parties
 Progressive Party (1901), Australia
 Progressive Party (1920), Australia
 Czech Realist Party (Czech Progressive Party), Austria-Hungary
 Progressive Party (Belgium)
 Toledo Progressive Party, Belize
 Progressive Party (Brazil, 1993)
 Progressive Party of Canada
 Progressive Party of Manitoba (1920–32)
 Progressive Party of Manitoba (1981–95)
 Progressive Party of Saskatchewan
 Progressive Party (Cape Colony)
 Chadian Progressive Party
 Progressive Party (China)
 Congolese Progressive Party
 Progressive Party (Greece) (1954–84)
 Progressive Party (Greece, Kafantaris)
 Kamtapur Progressive Party, India
 Donegal Progressive Party, Ireland
 Progressive Party (Israel)
 Progressive Party of Ivory Coast
 Moldavian Progressive Party
 Jim Anderton's Progressive Party, New Zealand
 Progressive Party (Philippines)
 Progressive Party (Portugal)
 Progressive Party (Russia)
 Saint Helena Progressive Party
 Serbian Progressive Party (historical) (1881–1919)
 Progressive Party (Singapore)
 Progressive Party (Spain)
 Progressive Party (South Africa)
 Progressive Party (South Korea, 1956)
 New Progressive Party (South Korea)
 Unified Progressive Party, South Korea
 Swaziland Progressive Party
 Progressive Party (Thailand)
 Progressive Party (London), UK

United States
 Progressive Party (United States, 1912) (Bull Moose Party)
 Progressive Party (United States, 1924–1934)
 Progressive Party (United States, 1948)
 California Progressive Party
 Minnesota Progressive Party
 Wisconsin Progressive Party

See also 
 Democratic Progressive Party, Taiwan
 National Progressive Party (disambiguation)
 New Progressive Party (disambiguation)
 Progress Party (disambiguation)
 Progressive Alliance (disambiguation)
 Progressive Conservative Party (disambiguation)
 Progressive Constitutionalist Party (disambiguation)
 Progressive Democratic Party (disambiguation)
 Progressive Green Party (disambiguation)
 Progressive Labor Party (disambiguation)
 Progressive National Party (disambiguation)
 Progressive People's Party (disambiguation)
 Progressive Reform Party (disambiguation)
 Progressive Republican Party (disambiguation)
 United Progressive Party (disambiguation)
 Progressive Union (disambiguation)